WPUB-FM (102.7 FM) is a radio station broadcasting an oldies format. Licensed to Camden, South Carolina, United States. Previous frequency was 94.3MHz until 1998.  The station is currently owned by Kershaw Radio Corporation. The station also broadcasts Camden, Lugoff-Elgin, and North Central High School Sports. The station is an affiliate of the South Carolina Gamecock Radio Network, Clemson Tigers Sports Network, as well as Atlanta Braves, Carolina Panthers, and MRN Radio. WPUB is also home of The Locker Room Sports Show, covering everything in Kershaw County Sports.

References

External links

PUB-FM
Oldies radio stations in the United States
Radio stations established in 1975
1975 establishments in South Carolina